Alberto Rigoni (born 1981) is an Italian bass guitarist and composer worldwide known as a solo artist and as member of BAD As, The Italians, Lady & THE BASS, and TwinSpirits (no longer active). He has been also co-producer of the Vivaldi Metal Project. Between 2008 and 2022 released 11 solo bass albums featuring guests such as Jordan Rudess (Dream Theater), Gavin Harrison (ex Porcupine Tree), Kevin Moore (ex - Dream Theater), Goran Edman (ex - Yngwie Malmsteen), Marco Minnemann (The Aristocrats), Thomas Lang, Nathan East, Leland Sklar, to name a few.

Biography 
Between 2008 and 2018 Alberto has released seven solo albums (Something Different, Rebirth, Three Wise Monkeys, Overloaded, BASSORAMA, Duality, EvoRevolution).

Rigoni has been featured on the cover of several magazines such as Bass Magazine (Japan), Bass Musician Magazine (USA), Bajos Y Bajistas (Spain), Basistas (Poland), TOP BASS (Poland). He has worked with Alexia, and plays bass for Canadian rock singer Kim Bingham.

In 2016 founded a metal band called BADASS (now called BAD As) featuring singer Titta Tani, guitarist Alessio "Lex" Tricarico and drummer Denis "Denzy" Novello. Their debut album More Pain, More Gain was released on 1 April 2017 by Lion Music / Cargo Records UK. In 2018 the line-up changed and on 31 November BAD AS released their second album Midnight Curse through Rockshot Records and toured in Europe opening for Vinnie Moore (UFO).

On 15 December 2017, Rigoni and bassist Jeff Hughell created a studio project called Bassists Alliance. The first album Crush features bassists Michael Manning, Adam Nitti, Steve di Giorgio, Colin Edwin, Mark Mitchell, Scott Reeder, Dmitry Lisenko, Brandino BassMaster, Ryan Martini, Leonid Maksimov, and Tony Grey.

In 2019 BAD As produced its third album Crucified Society (released by Sliptrick Records on 17 March 2020) and Alberto composed his eighth solo album featuring Thomas Lang on drums, released on 7 June 2019 under the name "Prog Injection".
In 2020 signs with Marquee/Belle Antique and Sliptrick Records for the release of his ninth instrumental prog solo album Odd Times featuring Marco Minnemann on drums and Alexandra Zerner on guitars and keyboards (release date: 28 June 2020 in Japan, 7 July rest of the world). He is now working with a new AOR band called "Natural Born Machine".

Discography

Solo 
Something Different (2008) (Lion Music)
Rebirth (2011) (Nightmare Records/Sony Music/RED)
Three Wise Monkeys (2012) (Any And All Records/ PowerProg)
Overloaded (2014) (Any And All Records/ PowerProg)
Into The BASS (2015) (Bass Guitar Magazine)
BASSORAMA (2016) (Pride And Joy Records / Edel / Come Back Music)
Duality (2017) (AR Productions)
EvoRevolution (feat. Marco Minnemann) (2018) (Total Metal)
Prog Injection (feat. Thomas Lang) (2019) (Total Metal)
Odd Times (feat. Marco Minnemann) (2020) (Marquee / Avalon Japan / Sliptrick Records)
For The Love OF Bass (2021) (AR Productions)
Metal Addicted (2021) feat. Marco Minnemann AR Productions
Songs for Souls (2022) (feat. Jordan Rudess and many others) AR Productions

with BADASS 
More Pain, More Gain (2016) ((Lion Music / Cargo Records UK)

with BAD As 
Midnight Curse (2019) (Rock Shot Records)
Crucified Society (2020) (SlipTrick Records)

with Vivaldi Metal Project 
Vivaldi Metal Project (2016) (Pride And Joy Music / King Records Japan)

with TwinSpirits 
The Music That Will Heal the World (2007) (Lion Music)
The Forbidden City (2009) (Lion Music)
Legacy (2011) (Lion Music)

with Natural Born Machine 
Human (2021) (Pride And Joy Music)

Other appearances 
A Step Ahead (Tommy Ermolli) (2009) (Lion Music)
Lady & The BASS (2010) (Emmeciesse Music Publishing)
Dragon Fire (Mistheria) (2010) (Lion Music)
Dolcetti Metal Beat (Gianni Rojatti) (2010) (Heart Of Steel Records)
Obsession (The BASStards) (2011) (Black Cavia Records)
iCanzonissime (Alexia) (2013) (Universal Music)
Warnings (John Jeff Touch) (2014) (Web Art Records)
Live at Teatro delle Voci (The Italians) (2016) (self-produced)
Crush (Bassist Alliance Project) (2017) (self-produced)
iCanzonissime with Alexa (2013) (Universal Music)
Warnings featuring John Jeff Touch (2014) (Web Art Records)
Live at Teatro delle Voci with The Italians (2016) (self-produced)
Crush featuring Bassist Alliance Project (2016) (self-produced)

References

External links 
Official Homepage
Bandcamp Page
Alberto on Spotify
Discogs page

1981 births
Living people
Italian bass guitarists
Male bass guitarists